Joseph Charles Muhler (December 22, 1923 – December 24, 1996) was an American biochemist and dentist who was responsible for the development of Crest Toothpaste.

Early life and education 
Muhler was born in Fort Wayne, Indiana. He attended Indiana University from 1942 to 1944 until he was drafted into the Navy. He returned to Indiana University as a dental student through the support of the Navy. In 1948, he received his D.D.S and in 1951, he received his Ph.D. in chemistry. He joined the IU faculty in 1951 as an assistant professor. In 1978, he was named research professor of dental science and director of the dentistry's research institute. While at Indiana University, he assisted in the development of the school's first preventative dentistry program until his retirement in 1984.

Crest Toothpaste 
Muhler was a biochemist who led a team at Indiana University that came up with the original formula for Crest Toothpaste. He studied over 150 fluoride compounds for the purpose of finding a compound that protected teeth from cavities and decay. With help from Harry G. Day, Grant Van Huysen, and William H. Nebergall, he found that stannous fluoride was a very effective compound for protecting teeth. After years of studies, they found stannous fluoride to be 50% more effective than sodium fluoride. Procter & Gamble was impressed with their research and decided to underwrite their formula and sell it as Crest Toothpaste in 1956. Crest Toothpaste became the first toothpaste to earn the American Dental Association (ADA) endorsement. Muhler and his team received royalties from Procter & Gamble which they used to help establish the Oral Health Research Institute at Indiana.

Accomplishments 
In 1976, the American Chemical Society (ACS) recognized stannous fluoride toothpaste as one of the 100 greatest discoveries of the previous 100 years. Muhler died on December 24, 1996, at St. Joseph Medical Center in Fort Wayne, Indiana. In 2019, 23 years after his death, both he and William H. Nebergall were elected into the National Inventors Hall of Fame.

References 

1923 births
1996 deaths
20th-century American biochemists
People from Fort Wayne, Indiana
Indiana University alumni
Scientists from Indiana
Indiana University faculty
American dentists
American dentistry academics
20th-century dentists
United States Navy personnel of World War II